The 1982–83 New York Rangers season was the franchise's 57th season. During the regular season, New York compiled a 35–35–10 record and finished in fourth place in the Patrick Division. The Rangers qualified for the NHL playoffs, where they defeated the Philadelphia Flyers in a three-game sweep in the first round. In the Patrick Division Finals, the Rangers were defeated by the New York Islanders in six games.

Regular season

Final standings

Schedule and results

|- align="center" bgcolor="#FFBBBB"
| 1 || 6 || Washington Capitals || 5–4 || 0–1–0
|- align="center" bgcolor="#FFBBBB"
| 2 || 8 || @ New Jersey Devils || 3–2 || 0–2–0
|- align="center" bgcolor="#CCFFCC"
| 3 || 9 || @ Pittsburgh Penguins || 5–3 || 1–2–0
|- align="center" bgcolor="#FFBBBB"
| 4 || 11 || New York Islanders || 4–3 || 1–3–0
|- align="center" bgcolor="#CCFFCC"
| 5 || 13 || Philadelphia Flyers || 5–2 || 2–3–0
|- align="center" bgcolor="#FFBBBB"
| 6 || 16 || @ Montreal Canadiens || 8–2 || 2–4–0
|- align="center" bgcolor="#FFBBBB"
| 7 || 17 || Los Angeles Kings || 5–3 || 2–5–0
|- align="center" bgcolor="#CCFFCC"
| 8 || 20 || Vancouver Canucks || 6–5 || 3–5–0
|- align="center" bgcolor="#FFBBBB"
| 9 || 23 || @ New York Islanders || 5–2 || 3–6–0
|- align="center" bgcolor="#CCFFCC"
| 10 || 24 || Minnesota North Stars || 4–2 || 4–6–0
|- align="center" bgcolor="#CCFFCC"
| 11 || 27 || Calgary Flames || 7–4 || 5–6–0
|- align="center" bgcolor="#FFBBBB"
| 12 || 30 || @ Quebec Nordiques || 5–4 || 5–7–0
|- align="center" bgcolor="#CCFFCC"
| 13 || 31 || Pittsburgh Penguins || 6–2 || 6–7–0
|-

|- align="center" bgcolor="#FFBBBB"
| 14 || 5 || @ Edmonton Oilers || 5–1 || 6–8–0
|- align="center" bgcolor="white"
| 15 || 6 || @ Calgary Flames || 2–2 || 6–8–1
|- align="center" bgcolor="#CCFFCC"
| 16 || 10 || St. Louis Blues || 5–4 || 7–8–1
|- align="center" bgcolor="#FFBBBB"
| 17 || 11 || @ Philadelphia Flyers || 7–3 || 7–9–1
|- align="center" bgcolor="#FFBBBB"
| 18 || 14 || Edmonton Oilers || 7–2 || 7–10–1
|- align="center" bgcolor="#CCFFCC"
| 19 || 17 || Toronto Maple Leafs || 6–1 || 8–10–1
|- align="center" bgcolor="#CCFFCC"
| 20 || 20 || @ Toronto Maple Leafs || 6–3 || 9–10–1
|- align="center" bgcolor="#CCFFCC"
| 21 || 21 || New York Islanders || 7–3 || 10–10–1
|- align="center" bgcolor="#CCFFCC"
| 22 || 24 || Minnesota North Stars || 8–5 || 11–10–1
|- align="center" bgcolor="#CCFFCC"
| 23 || 27 || @ New York Islanders || 3–0 || 12–10–1
|- align="center" bgcolor="#FFBBBB"
| 24 || 28 || @ Buffalo Sabres || 7–3 || 12–11–1
|-

|- align="center" bgcolor="#CCFFCC"
| 25 || 1 || Hartford Whalers || 6–1 || 13–11–1
|- align="center" bgcolor="#FFBBBB"
| 26 || 4 || @ Hartford Whalers || 5–2 || 13–12–1
|- align="center" bgcolor="#CCFFCC"
| 27 || 5 || Toronto Maple Leafs || 6–5 || 14–12–1
|- align="center" bgcolor="#FFBBBB"
| 28 || 8 || @ Chicago Black Hawks || 7–2 || 14–13–1
|- align="center" bgcolor="white"
| 29 || 10 || @ Washington Capitals || 4–4 || 14–13–2
|- align="center" bgcolor="#CCFFCC"
| 30 || 12 || New Jersey Devils || 4–0 || 15–13–2
|- align="center" bgcolor="#CCFFCC"
| 31 || 15 || Los Angeles Kings || 7–1 || 16–13–2
|- align="center" bgcolor="#FFBBBB"
| 32 || 17 || New York Islanders || 5–2 || 16–14–2
|- align="center" bgcolor="white"
| 33 || 18 || @ Detroit Red Wings || 3–3 || 16–14–3
|- align="center" bgcolor="#CCFFCC"
| 34 || 20 || Pittsburgh Penguins || 6–3 || 17–14–3
|- align="center" bgcolor="#FFBBBB"
| 35 || 22 || Buffalo Sabres || 3–1 || 17–15–3
|- align="center" bgcolor="#FFBBBB"
| 36 || 26 || @ Pittsburgh Penguins || 4–3 || 17–16–3
|- align="center" bgcolor="#CCFFCC"
| 37 || 30 || @ New Jersey Devils || 5–2 || 18–16–3
|-

|- align="center" bgcolor="#CCFFCC"
| 38 || 1 || @ Washington Capitals || 7–2 || 19–16–3
|- align="center" bgcolor="#CCFFCC"
| 39 || 3 || Detroit Red Wings || 6–2 || 20–16–3
|- align="center" bgcolor="white"
| 40 || 5 || Buffalo Sabres || 3–3 || 20–16–4
|- align="center" bgcolor="#CCFFCC"
| 41 || 7 || Quebec Nordiques || 5–1 || 21–16–4
|- align="center" bgcolor="#CCFFCC"
| 42 || 9 || New Jersey Devils || 4–3 || 22–16–4
|- align="center" bgcolor="white"
| 43 || 12 || Winnipeg Jets || 5–5 || 22–16–5
|- align="center" bgcolor="#FFBBBB"
| 44 || 15 || @ Boston Bruins || 2–0 || 22–17–5
|- align="center" bgcolor="#FFBBBB"
| 45 || 16 || Philadelphia Flyers || 4–0 || 22–18–5
|- align="center" bgcolor="white"
| 46 || 18 || @ Vancouver Canucks || 3–3 || 22–18–6
|- align="center" bgcolor="#FFBBBB"
| 47 || 21 || @ Winnipeg Jets || 4–1 || 22–19–6
|- align="center" bgcolor="#FFBBBB"
| 48 || 23 || @ Philadelphia Flyers || 3–1 || 22–20–6
|- align="center" bgcolor="#FFBBBB"
| 49 || 24 || Boston Bruins || 3–1 || 22–21–6
|- align="center" bgcolor="#FFBBBB"
| 50 || 27 || Montreal Canadiens || 4–1 || 22–22–6
|- align="center" bgcolor="#CCFFCC"
| 51 || 29 || @ Pittsburgh Penguins || 2–1 || 23–22–6
|- align="center" bgcolor="#FFBBBB"
| 52 || 30 || Chicago Black Hawks || 5–4 || 23–23–6
|-

|- align="center" bgcolor="white"
| 53 || 1 || @ Los Angeles Kings || 5–5 || 23–23–7
|- align="center" bgcolor="white"
| 54 || 5 || @ St. Louis Blues || 2–2 || 23–23–8
|- align="center" bgcolor="#FFBBBB"
| 55 || 6 || @ Chicago Black Hawks || 4–1 || 23–24–8
|- align="center" bgcolor="#FFBBBB"
| 56 || 10 || @ Minnesota North Stars || 7–5 || 23–25–8
|- align="center" bgcolor="#CCFFCC"
| 57 || 12 || @ Montreal Canadiens || 3–2 || 24–25–8
|- align="center" bgcolor="#CCFFCC"
| 58 || 16 || Washington Capitals || 5–4 || 25–25–8
|- align="center" bgcolor="#FFBBBB"
| 59 || 19 || @ Philadelphia Flyers || 8–5 || 25–26–8
|- align="center" bgcolor="#CCFFCC"
| 60 || 20 || Winnipeg Jets || 9–4 || 26–26–8
|- align="center" bgcolor="#CCFFCC"
| 61 || 23 || Hartford Whalers || 11–3 || 27–26–8
|- align="center" bgcolor="#FFBBBB"
| 62 || 26 || @ Quebec Nordiques || 6–3 || 27–27–8
|- align="center" bgcolor="#CCFFCC"
| 63 || 28 || Pittsburgh Penguins || 9–3 || 28–27–8
|-

|- align="center" bgcolor="white"
| 64 || 1 || @ Pittsburgh Penguins || 3–3 || 28–27–9
|- align="center" bgcolor="#FFBBBB"
| 65 || 3 || Washington Capitals || 4–3 || 28–28–9
|- align="center" bgcolor="#FFBBBB"
| 66 || 6 || New Jersey Devils || 6–4 || 28–29–9
|- align="center" bgcolor="#FFBBBB"
| 67 || 8 || @ Vancouver Canucks || 7–3 || 28–30–9
|- align="center" bgcolor="#FFBBBB"
| 68 || 11 || @ Edmonton Oilers || 3–1 || 28–31–9
|- align="center" bgcolor="#CCFFCC"
| 69 || 12 || @ Calgary Flames || 4–1 || 29–31–9
|- align="center" bgcolor="#CCFFCC"
| 70 || 14 || Philadelphia Flyers || 8–2 || 30–31–9
|- align="center" bgcolor="#CCFFCC"
| 71 || 16 || New York Islanders || 2–1 || 31–31–9
|- align="center" bgcolor="#FFBBBB"
| 72 || 20 || Boston Bruins || 4–0 || 31–32–9
|- align="center" bgcolor="#FFBBBB"
| 73 || 21 || @ New Jersey Devils || 4–2 || 31–33–9
|- align="center" bgcolor="#CCFFCC"
| 74 || 23 || @ Detroit Red Wings || 7–1 || 32–33–9
|- align="center" bgcolor="#FFBBBB"
| 75 || 26 || @ New York Islanders || 3–2 || 32–34–9
|- align="center" bgcolor="#CCFFCC"
| 76 || 27 || Washington Capitals || 5–4 || 33–34–9
|- align="center" bgcolor="#CCFFCC"
| 77 || 29 || @ St. Louis Blues || 4–3 || 34–34–9
|- align="center" bgcolor="#CCFFCC"
| 78 || 31 || @ Philadelphia Flyers || 4–2 || 35–34–9
|-

|- align="center" bgcolor="white"
| 79 || 1 || New Jersey Devils || 3–3 || 35–34–10
|- align="center" bgcolor="#FFBBBB"
| 80 || 3 || @ Washington Capitals || 3–0 || 35–35–10
|-

Playoffs

Key:  Win  Loss

Player statistics
Skaters

Goaltenders

†Denotes player spent time with another team before joining Rangers. Stats reflect time with Rangers only.
‡Traded mid-season. Stats reflect time with Rangers only.

Awards and records

Transactions

Draft picks
New York's picks at the 1982 NHL Entry Draft in Montreal, Quebec, Canada at the Montreal Forum.

Farm teams

See also
 1982–83 NHL season

References

New York Rangers seasons
New York Rangers
New York Rangers
New York Rangers
New York Rangers
1980s in Manhattan
Madison Square Garden